The 1956 anti-Tamil pogrom, also known as the Gal Oya riots, was the first organised pogrom against Sri Lankan Tamils in the Dominion of Ceylon. It began with anti-Tamil rioting in Colombo, followed by anti-Sinhalese rioting in Batticaloa. The worst of the violence took place in the Gal Oya valley, where local majority Sinhalese colonists and employees of the Gal Oya Development Board commandeered government vehicles, dynamite and weapons and massacred minority Tamils. It is estimated that over 150 people died during the violence. The police and army were eventually able to bring the situation under control.

Background information

By 1956, 50% of clerical jobs were held by Tamils, although they were a minority of the country's population. This was partly due to the availability of Western style education built by American missionaries in the Tamil dominant Jaffna peninsula during the colonial era. The overrepresentation of Tamils was used by populist Sinhalese politicians to come to political power by promising to elevate the Sinhalese people. The pro-Sinhalese nationalist Freedom Party came to power in 1956 promising to make Sinhala, the language of the majority Sinhalese people, the sole official language. This Sinhala only policy was opposed by the Tamil Federal party which conducted a nonviolent sit-in protest on June 5, 1956, in front of the parliament in Colombo, the capital city. About 200 Tamil leaders and politicians took part in this protest.

Gal Oya settlement scheme

Gal Oya settlement scheme was begun in 1949 to settle landless peasants in formerly jungle land. In 1956 the settlement had over 50 new villages where over 5,000 ethnic Tamil, Muslim, Indigenous Veddha and Sinhalese were settled. The Sinhalese were approximately 50% of the settlers. Sinhalese and others were spatially separated from each other as Sinhalese were settled at the more productive headwaters of the Gal Oya tank and the Tamils and Muslims at the down rivers closer to their former native villages. Settlement of large number of Sinhalese peasants in what Tamil nationalists considered their traditional Tamil homeland, was a source of tension within the settlement area.

Riots

Colombo
Federal Party protestors were attacked by a Sinhalese mob that was led by K. M. P. Rajaratne. The same mob, after listening to a speech by populist Sinhalese politicians urging them to boycott Tamil business, went on a looting spree in the city. Over 150 Tamil owned shops were looted and many people were hospitalized for their injuries. But these disturbances were quickly brought under control by the police.

Batticaloa
Following the riots in Colombo, Tamil rioters in Batticaloa attacked Sinhalese. Sinhalese houses were burnt and Sinhalese people were assaulted. In one case, a Sinhalese hotel was burned. An employee of this hotel emerged from the burning hotel and fired at a crowd that had gathered to watch the conflagration, killing 2. Police had also fired on crowd of 10,000 demonstrating Tamils, killing another 2. Tamils from Karaitivu had thrown stones at Gal Oya Board trucks. Near Kalmunai, a group of 11 Tamils hid in trees and shot at a convoy of Sinhalese civilians and government officials, killing 2.

Gal Oya
On June 9th, the trucks that had been stoned arrived in Gal Oya. News of the attacks on Sinhalese in Batticaloa started reaching the valley, and with it, false rumours. The chief amongst the rumours was that a Sinhalese girl had been raped and made to walk naked down the street in Batticaloa by a Tamil mob. Although this was later proved to be false, the rumor inflamed the passions of the mob and led to further massacres and property destruction. The riots began on the evening of June 11, 1956, when agitated mobs began roaming the streets of Gal Oya valley looking for Tamils. Properties owned by Tamils, including those of Indian Tamils, were looted and burned down. It was rumored that the local police made no attempt to control the mob.

Tamil refugees from Amparai had fled to the Amparai police station and the Circuit Bungalow under police protection. On the evening of June 12, a Sinhalese mob surrounded the latter location, threatening to break in. At first, police used tear gas to try and disperse the mob. The mob tried to stop a jeep with a Bren gun; at this point, the police opened fire, killing three of rioters. Then the mob severed the utilities and stole dynamite from a dynamite dump in Inginiyagala to try to blow up the bungalow. They were unable to acquire detonators, and by 11 PM, the military arrived and disperse the crowd.

On the morning of June 13, a truck arrived with Sinhalese refugees from Bakiela who had been attacked by Tamil colonists. By noon of that day, there were further rumors that an army of 6,000 Tamils armed with guns were in the process of approaching the Sinhalese settlements in the Gal Oya valley. This led local groups of Sinhalese men to commandeer government vehicles to travel to outlying Tamil villages while Sinhalese officials and settlers fled. It was only after the arrival of army reinforcements and stern action taken by them that the killings and destruction were suppressed.

Casualties

See also
 List of riots in Sri Lanka
 Sri Lankan Civil War

Notes

References

Further reading
  Buddhist Nationalism and religious violence in Sri Lanka – Prof. Nicholas Gier

1956 riots
1956 in Ceylon
History of Sri Lanka (1948–present)
Sri Lankan Tamil politics
Ethnic riots
Riots and civil disorder in Sri Lanka
Massacres in Sri Lanka
Mass murder in 1956
June 1956 events in Asia